The Indiana University School of Medicine (IUSM) is a major multi-campus medical school located in the US state of Indiana. There are nine campuses throughout the state; the principal research, educational, and medical center is located on the Indiana University–Purdue University Indianapolis (IUPUI) campus in Indianapolis. With 1,436 MD students and 200 PhD students in 2021, IUSM is one of the largest medical schools in the United States. The school offers many joint-degree programs including an MD-PhD Medical Scientist Training Program in a partnership with Purdue University's Weldon School of Biomedical Engineering. It is the medical school with the largest number of graduates licensed in the United States per a 2018 Federation of State Medical Boards survey with 11,828 licensed physicians.

The school has pioneered research in multiple specialties, including oncology, immunology, substance use, neuroscience, and endocrinology. Research discoveries include a curative therapy for testicular cancer, the development of echocardiography, the identification of several genes linked to Alzheimer's disease, and the creation of inner ear sensory cells from pluripotent stem cells.

In the 2021 U.S. News & World Report rankings of the best graduate schools for medicine, the school ranked 20th in the nation for primary care and 47th for research out of about 150 medical schools. In the U.S. News & World Report rankings of the best hospitals, the Indiana University Health Medical Center had seventeen nationally ranked clinical programs. The Riley Hospital for Children at Indiana University Health is nationally ranked in 9 of 10 designated specialties for children in the U.S. News & World Report. The IU School of Medicine is also home to the Melvin and Bren Simon Comprehensive Cancer Center, a National Cancer Institute-designated Comprehensive Cancer Center.

History
Indiana University (IU) established a department of medicine at Bloomington in 1903, but the school in Indianapolis traces its founding to 1908, following the resolution of a rivalry with Purdue University over which institution had the legal authority to establish a medical school in Marion County (Indianapolis). A year after the IU and Purdue-affiliated schools in Indianapolis were consolidated in 1908, the Indiana General Assembly authorized IU to operate a medical school in Marion County.

Founding

In March 1903, William Lowe Bryan, tenth president of IU, proposed the formation of a department of medicine at IU Bloomington to the university trustees. The new department was approved and established in May of the same year. The IU School of Medicine was admitted as a member of the Association of American Medical Colleges (AAMC) in 1904.

In addition to IUSM in Bloomington, IU's leaders wanted to locate medical training facilities in Indianapolis. Their initial plan was to provide medical students with the first two years of coursework at Bloomington and the final two years at Indianapolis, where students would receive clinically-based training as part of their studies. Prior to 1908, due primarily to the high cost of establishing its own medical facilities in Indianapolis, IU attempted to merge with existing medical schools, but the effort was unsuccessful.

Rivalry with Purdue University 
The current school in Indianapolis is a mixture of several earlier medical colleges. In 1869, the Medical College of Indiana opened in Indianapolis. This institution would associate with IU from 1871 to 1876. In 1879 two more medical schools opened—the Central College of Physicians and Surgeons in Indianapolis and the Fort Wayne College of Medicine. After the school of medicine in Bloomington was founded in 1903 formal negotiations opened between IU and the Medical College of Indiana to merge the schools; however, the IU trustees failed to ratify the Medical College of Indiana's proposal, and by 1904 the matter was indefinitely abandoned. 

While negotiations were ongoing between IU and the Medical College of Indiana, representatives from the Central College of Physicians and Surgeons approached Purdue University's medical department in West Lafayette, which was established circa 1900, to arrange a similar union. In May 1905 the Medical College of Indiana submitted the same proposal ("...to give its property and assets of an appraised value of $100,000 to the University, and to accompany the gift by its good will and the gratuitous services of its faculty; the motive being to permanently establish a medical college of high order in connection with an educational institution of good standing.") that had failed ratification with IU to Purdue's trustees. The trustees took the proposal into consideration, and were "convinced that the conditions were unusually favorable to the consummation of a union of interests where all previous efforts had failed, and to the inauguration of a progressive educational movement of great value to the State." By September the proposal was accepted subject to the approval of the state legislature, and the Medical College of Indiana became part of Purdue University with the full title of the Indiana Medical College, the School of Medicine of Purdue University. 

On September 25, 1905, the trustees of the Central College of Physicians and Surgeons voted to suspend operations and to transfer the students, alumni, personal property, and funds of the college to the Purdue School of Medicine. Later on October 2, the Fort Wayne College of Medicine voted to likewise merge with the Purdue School of Medicine and transfer personnel and equipment to Indianapolis. The Purdue School of Medicine operated out of the former Medical College of Indiana's facilities on Senate Avenue in Indianapolis. The building that housed the Central College of Physicians and Surgeons at 212 North Senate Avenue was sold. In May 1906, 122 students received medical degrees from Purdue University and successfully passed the examination of the State Board of Medical Registration. In the spring of 1907, Purdue graduated 68 men and four women; in that class was Arett C. Arnett, a physician who helped establish a Lafayette clinic in 1922 later known as Arnett Clinic and today known as Indiana University Health Arnett Hospital.

The founding of Purdue's medical school triggered a debate over which state university, IU or Purdue, had the legal authority to establish a state-supported, four-year medical school in Indianapolis. IU believed that under a legislative act approved on February 15, 1838, it had the authorization alone to provide state-supported instruction in medicine, but the development of a medical school was delayed due to a lack of sufficient funding. 

The building that was sold and housed the former Central College of Physicians and Surgeons would eventually come under the ownership of IU supporters, who would establish the State College of Physicians and Surgeons there in 1906. This college offered clinical instructions to IU Bloomington's third- and fourth-year medical students. The State College of Physicians and Surgeons enrolled 109 students in September 1906. In August 1907 the IU board of trustees agreed to a merger of the IU School of Medicine in Bloomington with the State College of Physicians and Surgeons in Indianapolis but agreed to take financial responsibility for only the school's facilities in Monroe County (Bloomington). The first two years of training continued at Bloomington and the final two years of clinical training were held at the State College of Physicians and Surgeons in Indianapolis, with a doctor of medicine (MD) degree conferred by Indiana University.

Incorporation of Purdue and move to Indianapolis 

To resolve their ongoing dispute, IU and Purdue leaders, along with their supporters, sought approval from the Indiana General Assembly to operate their own schools of medicine in Marion County. Following a lengthy multi-month debate, Purdue president Winthrop E. Stone relented. In April 1908 IU and Purdue reached an agreement that consolidated IUSM in Bloomington; the State College of Physicians and Surgeons in Indianapolis; and the Indiana Medical College, the School of Medicine of Purdue University and retained the name Indiana University School of Medicine. On February 26, 1909, the state legislature formally authorized IU to operate a medical school in Marion County and clearly mandated that IU assume total responsibility for the state's public medical school. The state legislature's authorization allowed IU to operate its own medical school in Marion County and enabled IU's medical students to complete all four years of their medical education in Indianapolis or remain in Bloomington for their first year before transferring.

Early leadership and enrollment
Dr. Allison Maxwell agreed to serve as the first dean of the four-year IU School of Medicine in Indianapolis in April 1908; he remained as its dean until 1911. Maxwell led the fledgling school through a difficult time when financial budgets were an issue and the consolidation of IU's and Purdue's medical school faculties in Indianapolis and Bloomington was completed. The combined faculty would support the four-year medical school at Indianapolis and maintain the two-year, pre-clinical coursework at Bloomington. In addition to Maxwell, other leaders in IUSM's early history were drawn from Johns Hopkins University, including Charles P. Emerson who was appointed as the second dean of IUSM in 1911 and served in that role until 1931.

Willis Dew Gatch became the third dean of the medical school in 1932. In 1909, Gatch invented the Gatch adjustable hospital bed, which used a crank to raise and lower the patient's head and feet. John D. VanNuys, a 1936 graduate of IUSM, became its fourth dean in 1947. Amelia R. Keller, department of pediatrics, was the sole woman on the clinical faculty of the IU Medical School in Indianapolis after the school's consolidation with the Purdue School of Medicine in 1908.

IUSM graduated its first class of twenty-seven students and conferred its first Doctor of Medicine degree in May 1907. The first graduation of the consolidated IU and Purdue schools of medicine took place the following year. IUSM's first black student, Clarence Lucas, graduated in 1908; the first woman graduate of the newly-consolidated school, Lillian Mueller, did so in 1909.

The Flexner Report
Abraham Flexner, a renowned American educator whose work helped reform many medical schools, visited IUSM in November 1909. He noted in his later Flexner Report (1910): "The situation in the state [was], thanks to the intelligent attitude of the university, distinctly hopeful, though it will take time to work it fully."

Flexner also made a recommendation for the progress of the school: "In order to make the school attractive to highly qualified students, it will be necessary (1) to employ full-time men in the work of the first two years, (2) to strengthen the laboratory equipment, (3) greatly improve the organization and conduct of the clinical courses." The IU School of Medicine was one of few medical schools in the nation at the time to receive a positive evaluation from Flexner, primarily because of its strong emphasis on college preparatory coursework in the sciences prior to enrolling in medical school and its additional training in the basic sciences as part of its medical school curriculum.

Early facilities
In its early years in Indianapolis, IUSM used the former State College of Physicians and Surgeons facilities (also the former Central College of Physicians and Surgeons facilities), erected in 1902 and located at the corner of Market Street and Senate Avenue. After the consolidation of IUSM with the State College of Physicians and Surgeons and the Purdue School of Medicine in 1908, the medical school used the former Purdue school facilities (which were the former Medical College of Indiana's facilities) for about ten years while it secured financing to construct new medical school buildings. Several of the medical school's early buildings in Indianapolis were erected in the 1910s and 1920s on property that would eventually become the site of the IU Medical Center on the present-day IUPUI campus.

In February 1912, IU acquired property on West Michigan Street, near the Indianapolis City Hospital (the modern-day Sidney & Lois Eskenazi Hospital), to erect the Robert W. Long Hospital. Construction on the new teaching hospital began in 1912. Although its cornerstone was laid on November 1, 1912, the Great Flood of 1913 delayed the building's opening until 1914. Long Hospital was dedicated on June 15, 1914, and admitted its first patients the following day. Long Hospital remained in operation until 1970 when it was replaced by University Hospital.

The cornerstone of the Riley Hospital for Children was laid on October 7, 1923, and dedicated on October 7, 1924. The hospital, named in honor of Hoosier poet James Whitcomb Riley, was erected north of Long Hospital. The James Whitcomb Riley Association (now known as the Riley Children's Foundation) hoped to raise an initial $250,000 in funding to add to the state's appropriation. By 1923 it had received $911,518 in pledges from more than 30,000 citizens, including $45,000 in donations from a mass fundraising event. Significant additions to the hospital were built over the years, including three in the 1930s: a Kiwanis Unit, dedicated in 1930; a Rotary Unit, dedicated in 1931; and a hydrotherapy pool in 1935.

Another of the medical school's early teaching hospitals was the William H. Coleman Hospital for Women. Erected west of Long Hospital and dedicated on October 20, 1927, Coleman Hospital's total cost was about $300,000. Other early buildings erected on the medical school campus in Indianapolis included the Ball Residence for Nurses, dedicated on October 7, 1928; and Fesler Hall, built in 1939. Myers Hall was built in Bloomington in 1937 for the medical students there. The school's medical research building was expanded in 1947 with a five-year grant from the Riley Children's Foundation. The VanNuys Medical Sciences Building opened in Indianapolis in 1958.

Consolidation and expansion 

Following the opening of VanNuys, all medical instruction was moved to Indianapolis. About half of the Bloomington faculty moved, with the remaining faculty forming the Department of Anatomy and Physiology at IU Bloomington. Not wanting Myers Hall to go unused, IU president Herman B. Wells secured funding for an advanced degree program that combined the first two years of basic science training of the MD program with a master's degree or PhD. A similar program was available at Stanford University at the time. Due to a projected shortage of American physicians in the early 1960s, some state politicians called for a second medical school. IUSM ceased its consolidatory efforts in Indianapolis and instead looked for partners throughout the state to expand medical education; Bloomington students were also now able to once again transfer to Indianapolis after the completion of their first two years. IUSM found its partners in 1968 at the University of Notre Dame in South Bend and with its old rival, Purdue. About a dozen students at both Notre Dame and Purdue were allowed to complete the first two years at their regional campuses before transferring to Indianapolis. In 1971, the state legislature established a statewide system for medical education, and five other first-year training sites were added throughout the state by 1981 at IU Northwest in Gary, Indiana University–Purdue University Fort Wayne, Ball State University in Muncie, Indiana State University in Terre Haute, and at a joint venture of the University of Evansville and the University of Southern Indiana in Evansville. By 1990 all regional campuses were able to provide the first two years of education before Indianapolis transfer. Faced with another call for more physicians in the early 2000s, all campuses offered full four-year programs by 2014, allowing students to complete their degrees at a regional campus without transfer to Indianapolis. 

In August 2021, IUSM–Bloomington, along with IU Health Bloomington Hospital in December, moved into the newly-built Regional Academic Health Center (RAHC), making it one of two regional campuses to be located in a hospital or on hospital property. The other campus is IUSM–Muncie, which is located on Ball Memorial Hospital property. Also located in the RAHC are the Bloomington campuses of the IU School of Nursing and the IU School of Social Work, as well as the IU Bloomington Department of Speech, Language, and Hearing Pathology.  

On October 19, 2022, IUSM–Indianapolis broke ground to create a new, $230 million medical education and research building.

Curriculum
In 2003, it was one of ten medical schools nationwide chosen by the American Medical Association to develop new methods of teaching professionalism to doctors. In order to ensure that its educational process more accurately reflected its commitment to graduating caring and competent physicians, the Indiana University School of Medicine initiated a competency curriculum in 1999. To support the values expressed in the competency-based curriculum, the IU School of Medicine simultaneously implemented a school-wide "relationship-centered care initiative" to address its informal curriculum.

In 2016 the IU School of Medicine implemented a new curriculum to prepare students to meet the challenges of a complex, ever-evolving healthcare environment. The new curriculum prepares students to practice medicine in a team-based interdisciplinary setting.

IUSM offers several combined degree programs: the MD-PhD, MD-MBA, MD-MPH, MD-MS, MD-JD, and MD-MA. The MD-PhD program, which offers full tuition and a stipend to students, is one of many programs to be designated an MSTP by the National Institute of Health. IUSM provides the MD component, and Purdue University's Weldon School of Biomedical Engineering provides the PhD.

Scholarly Concentration Program 
The Scholarly Concentration Program is an optional experience that complements a student's core medical curriculum. Students may research topics of personal interest, complete a scholarly project, and submit a manuscript for publication along with a poster presentation of their project. Projects are traditionally begun in the first year, with presentation and publication by the end of year four. Each campus hosts one to four topics that leverage the expertise of that particular campus. 

The following are the concentration topics available at each campus:

Campuses 

The school's main facilities are located on the campus of IUPUI in Indianapolis. In addition, the school maintains eight regional centers on college campuses throughout the state at Bloomington (IU Bloomington), Muncie (Ball State University), Fort Wayne (IU Fort Wayne), South Bend (University of Notre Dame), Terre Haute (Indiana State University), Evansville, West Lafayette (Purdue University), and Northwest–Gary (IU Northwest).

First- and second-year medical students attend classes at either the main campus at IUPUI in Indianapolis or at one of the eight regional centers. Students may elect to complete all coursework and clerkships at a regional center, or transfer to the Indianapolis campus for third- and fourth-year clerkships. Regional center students part of the Early Decision Program (a program where Indiana residents apply to only IUSM and are notified of a decision by October 1 of that application cycle) are required to complete all four years at their regional center. Due to the Liaison Committee on Medical Education (LCME) accreditation requirement stating that students must have some interaction with a resident physician, campuses that do not have a nearby residency program must allow students to attend at least one third-year rotation at a campus that does.

Evansville campus
The Evansville campus was founded in 1972 as part of IUSM's regional campus system founded in 1971 which would allow medical students to complete their first and second years away from Indianapolis. The first class of five students split their time between the University of Southern Indiana (USI) and the University of Evansville (UE). Students attended gross anatomy lab in the back of UE's student union until better arrangements were established. In 1994, all courses moved to USI's Health Professions Center and in 2014, students were able to complete all four years at the regional campus. In 2018, courses moved to the new  Stone Family Center for Health Sciences in downtown Evansville.

The Evansville campus includes expanded graduate medical education residencies through a consortium model with the Deaconess Health System, St. Vincent Evansville, Memorial Hospital and Health Care, and Owensboro Health.

Stone Family Center for Health Sciences 
In 2013, Indiana University, the University of Evansville, the University of Southern Indiana, and Ivy Tech Community College jointly signed letters of intent to co-locate a new interdisciplinary academic health science education in research campus in the Evansville region. The new campus was expected to open fall 2018. The interdisciplinary campus plan included a  simulation center with an advanced collaborative space. The facility was planned to be a combination of immersive training space, research, and potential product development.

In addition to the Evansville campus of IUSM, the Stone Center also houses healthcare and related programs from USI, UE, and Ivy Tech.

Clinical training facilities

IUSM helps train interns and residents in 92 medical and surgical specialties and subspecialties. In Indianapolis, students train under the supervision of faculty and staff at IU Health Methodist Hospital, IU Health University Hospital, Riley Hospital for Children at IU Health, the Richard L. Roudebush VA Medical Center, and Sidney and Lois Eskenazi Hospital. Most of the Indianapolis teaching hospitals are within walking distance or adjacent to IUPUI. Methodist Hospital is located a few miles from the main campus. 

IUSM has a partnership program with the Moi University School of Medicine in Eldoret, Kenya through AMPATH where students may complete a double rotation in their fourth year. Selection is based on an application and lottery system, as the program is very popular.

Regional campus students may complete rotations at other various physician offices and hospitals throughout the state of Indiana, such as Ball Memorial Hospital in Muncie, hospitals and clinics affiliated with the Deaconess Health System of the Illinois–Indiana–Kentucky tri-state area, Indiana University Health-affiliated hospitals and clinics, and many others.

Discoveries at IUSM 
The school was first in developing the use of echocardiography, a heart imaging technique using ultrasound. In the 1960s, Mori Aprison discovered the inhibitory neurotransmitter glycine. Dr. Paul Stark, another neuroscientist and faculty member at IUSM, led the clinical team at Eli Lilly and Company in the development of fluoxetine (Prozac), a widely prescribed antidepressant. In 1984, IUSM established the first DNA "bank" in the world; blood samples from clients were used to extract DNA which could indicate the genetic risk for certain illnesses and conditions. The school researchers also discovered the use of cord blood as an alternative source of hematopoietic stem cells and pioneered their use in the clinic. In the early 1990s, the school was one of the first institutions to study the use of computer systems in reducing the costs of healthcare management.

IUSM is the home of a National Cancer Institute-designated Clinical Cancer Center, and the only National Institute of Health-funded viral vector production facility for clinical grade therapeutics. The school is known for establishing a curative therapy for testicular cancer. The school has been a pioneer in establishing a cure for Fanconi anemia (a precancerous condition in children), specific radiation therapy techniques, techniques in a type of nerve-sparing surgery for urological cancers, the development of drugs to stimulate blood cell production, and novel drug therapies for breast cancer. Researchers at the medical school also discovered the cancer-fighting agent in tamoxifen. In 2011, the school announced plans for an institute specializing in personalized medicine, which would pursue an individualized and genomics-based approach to treating cancer, pediatrics, and obstetrics.

In 2012, federal officials designated IUSM and the Rehabilitation Hospital of Indiana as a Traumatic Brain Injury Model System site. As one of sixteen sites in the United States, the federally-funded center received a five-year, $2 million grant to research and treat traumatic brain injury and its impact on the lives of patients and their families. IUSM is also a member of the NCAA and the U.S. Department of Defense's CARE Consortium, a $30 million initiative to study concussions among student-athletes and use that knowledge to improve safety and health of athletes, military service members, and the general public. CARE Consortium research includes exploration of post-concussive symptoms; the performance and psychological health of student-athletes; and the analysis of data related to biomechanical, clinical, neuroimaging, neurobiological, and genetic markers of injury.

Research centers, institutes and groups
 Alzheimer's Disease and Related Disorders Center
 Bowen Research Center
 Center of Excellence in Women's Health
 Diabetes Translational Research Center
 Hartford Center of Excellence in Geriatric Medicine
 Herman B Wells Center for Pediatric Research
 Indiana Alcohol Research Center
 Indiana Alzheimer Disease Center
 Indiana Center for Musculoskeletal Health
 Indiana University Center for Diabetes and Metabolic Diseases
 Indiana Clinical and Translational Sciences Institute
 Indiana Spinal Cord and Head Injury Research Center
 Indiana University Melvin and Bren Simon Comprehensive Cancer Center
 Indiana University Center for Aging Research
 Institute of Psychiatric Research
 Krannert Institute of Cardiology
 Regenstrief Institute, Inc.
 Stark Neurosciences Research Institute
 Wells Center for Pediatric Research

Notable alumni and faculty
 Jerome Adams, former Indiana State Health Commissioner and 20th Surgeon General of the United States
 Kent Brantly, physician and author known for treating and contracting Ebola
 Otis R. Bowen, former Indiana governor and former secretary of Health and Human Services
 Allison Brashear, American neurologist and academic
 P. Michael Conneally, Distinguished Professor Emeritus of Medical and Molecular Genetics at IUSM; instrumental in the discovery of the gene causing Huntington's Disease; a leader in the Human Genome Project
 William S. Dalton, named president and CEO of the H. Lee Moffitt Cancer Center & Research Institute in 2002; former dean of the University of Arizona School of Medicine (2001–2002) 
 John P. Donohue (1932–2008)–former chair of the IU School of Medicine's urology department and distinguished professor emeritus; pioneered treatments for testicular cancer. His work with Lawrence Einhorn led to an increase in the cure rate of testicular cancer from 5% to 90%.
 Lawrence Einhorn, distinguished professor of medicine, IU Medical Center; recipient of a Presidential Medal of Honor; pioneered the development of the medical treatment in 1974 for testicular cancer, increasing the survival rate from 10% to 95%.
 Emily Erbelding, director of the Division of Microbiology and Infectious Diseases at the National Institute of Allergy and Infectious Diseases
 Henry Feffer, American neurosurgeon
 David L. Felten, a former professor at IUSM; MacArthur Fellow and neurobiologist whose research established a link between the immune and central nervous system
 Tatiana Foroud, internationally recognized genetics researcher
 Jane E. Henney, oncologist; first woman to serve as commissioner of the U.S. Food and Drug Administration
 Chet Jastremski, Olympic swimmer and medalist
 Suzanne Knoebel (1926–2014)–cardiologist; pioneer of computer technology for heart disease research and diagnosis
 R. Ellen Magenis, distinguished American pediatrician and geneticist
 Douglas Rex, American gastroenterologist and Distinguished Professor of medicine
 Joseph E. Robertson, president of Oregon Health & Science University since September 2006.
 Adam M. Robinson, Surgeon General of the United States Navy
 H. Michael Shepard, led the discovery and development of breast cancer drug Herceptin while at Genentech and was a Damon Runyon Cancer Research Foundation Fellow at Indiana University.
 Jill Bolte Taylor, neuroanatomist; in a TED talk she shared her experiences of studying herself during a stroke; authored My Stroke of Insight: A Brain Scientist's Personal Journey, a best-selling book which will be made into a major motion picture by Sony Pictures Entertainment and Imagine Entertainment.
 Robert William Schrier, founding editor-in-chief of the magazine Nature Clinical Practice Nephrology.
 John A. Galloway, endocrinologist
 David Wolf, astronaut

See also
List of medical schools in the United States

Notes

References

 
  
 
 
 Myers, Burton D., "A History of Medical Education in Indiana" in

External links

1903 establishments in Indiana
Educational institutions established in 1903
Healthcare in Indianapolis
Indiana University
Indiana University–Purdue University Indianapolis
Medical schools in Indiana
Universities and colleges in Indianapolis